TRPA can refer to:
 Tahoe Regional Planning Agency
 TRPA, a family of transient receptor potential ion channels